The Brahmani is a major seasonal river in the Odisha state of eastern India. The Brahmani is formed by the confluence of the Sankh and South Koel rivers, and flows through the districts of Sundargarh, Deogarh, Angul, Dhenkanal, Cuttack, Jajapur and Kendrapara. Also South Koel can be considered as upper reaches of Brahmani. Together with the river Baitarani, Brahmani forms a large delta before emptying into the Bay of Bengal at Dhamra. It is the second widest river in Odisha after Mahanadi .

Sources
The Brahmani is formed by the confluence of the rivers South Koel and Sankh near the major industrial town of Rourkela at 22 15'N and 84 47' E. The Sankh has its origins near the Jharkhand-Chhattisgarh border, not far from the Netarhat Plateau. The South Koel too arises in Jharkhand, near Lohardaga, on the other side of a watershed that also gives rise to the Damodar River. Both of these sources are in the Chota Nagpur Plateau. The site of the Brahmani's origin is mythologically reputed to be the place where Sage Parashara fell in love with the fisherman's daughter, Satyavati who later gave birth to Ved Vyasa, the compiler of the Mahabharata. The place is thus called Ved Vyasa.

After assuming the name of Brahmani, the river crosses the Tamra and Jharbera forests, skirting along National Highway 23. It then passes the town of Bonaigarh in Sundargarh district before being dammed at Rengali in Anugul district. A large reservoir of the same name is created as a consequence. It then flows through the towns of Talcher and Dhenkanal before splitting up into two streams.  The main stream flows by the town of Jajpur Road beyond which it is crossed by National Highway 16 and the Kolkata-Chennai mainline of East Coast Railway. The branch stream called Kimiria receives the waters of the Birupa (a distributary of the Mahanadi, Kelua and Genguti before re joining the main stream at Indupur. It then flows crisscrossing through Pattamundai. The river then receives the Kharsuan, on its left bank before merging with the Baitarani, a major river, to form the Dhamra estuary. A distributary called Maipara branches off here to join the Bay of Bengal a short distance away while the main stream proceeds northward for a few km more before ultimately meeting the sea near Chandbali at Palmyras Point. The Brahmani delta is the site of the Bhitarkanika wildlife sanctuary, famous for its estuarine crocodiles.

Length and catchment

Irrigation projects
Apart from the Rengali dam mentioned above, there also exists a barrage shortly before Talcher called Samal Barrage. The Jokadia and the Jenapur anicuts are the other irrigation projects on the river. Near its mouth, the river is also crossed by the Odisha Coast Canal that takes water from it.

References

Rivers of Odisha
Tributaries of the Mahanadi River
Rivers of India